"Work It" is a hip hop song written by American rapper Missy Elliott and her producer Tim "Timbaland" Mosley for Elliott's fourth studio album Under Construction (2002). The song's musical style, and production by Timbaland, were heavily inspired by old school hip hop from the early 1980s. It samples Run-D.M.C.'s "Peter Piper" and Rock Master Scott & the Dynamic Three's "Request Line".

Released as the album's first single on September 16, 2002, the track reached the number two position on the US Billboard Hot 100, becoming Missy Elliott's most successful single to date. A remix of this song features 50 Cent. The end of the song samples "Take Me to the Mardi Gras" by Bob James, and the synth pattern in the rhythm track samples the intro of "Heart of Glass" by Blondie.

Lyrics
A portion of the song's lyrics helped popularize the slang term "badonkadonk" with mainstream audiences ("Love the way my butt go bum-bump-bum-bump-bump/Keep your eyes on my bum-bump-bum-bump-bump/And think you can handle this badonk-a-donk-donk").

During the chorus, the lyric "I put my thing down, flip it, and reverse it" is followed by the same line played in reverse. In the middle of the song, after the lyric "Listen up close while I take you backwards", the lyric "Watch the way Missy like to take it backwards" is also played in reverse. Elliott also used reversed vocals in several of her productions during the following years.

In the song's chorus, an elephant trumpeting is heard to hide a sexual reference ("If you got a big [elephant trumpet], let me search it"). This is present in the explicit and edited versions; the obscured word is meant to be left to the listener's imagination. In both the explicit and edited versions, the song uses onomatopoeia such as "ra-ta-ta-ta" and "buboomp buboomp boomp" to refer to sexual bodily moves.

Music video
The music video to "Work It" was directed by Dave Meyers. Timbaland and Tweet make cameos in the video. Alyson Stoner appears as the lead kid dancer. The video pays tribute to Aaliyah (1979–2001) and Lisa "Left Eye" Lopes (1971–2002), who at the time had both recently died. They are commemorated in the music video with their images airbrushed on a car's hood. It also features an appearance by dancer and graffiti writer Mr. Wiggles from Rock Steady Crew. There is another music video that features 50 Cent rapping the first verse on the remix.

In shooting the video, director Myers shot the opening scene with live honey bees; only one crew member was stung. Additionally, he forgot to replace a glass of wine with a glass of water when filming the restaurant scene, so Elliott was heavily drunk after production.

The video won the award for Video of the Year at the 2003 MTV Video Music Awards. In a 2010 interview with "Dance Spirit", Alyson Stoner revealed that she almost didn't go to the audition for "Work It" and her dancing is featured in a clean part of the video. "Work It" was choreographed by Hi-Hat. Alyson Stoner won the role of Lead Kid Dancer out of 400 to 500 kids. In 2018, Billboard critics ranked it 2nd among the "greatest music videos of the 21st century."

Alyson Stoner tribute video
In 2015, 13 years after "Work It" came out Alyson Stoner reunited with her former co-stars to release a tribute dance video of "Work It" for Missy Elliott. This was done after people had been asking her why she didn't dance with Missy Elliott and Katy Perry during the 2015 Super Bowl.

Critical reception
John Bush of AllMusic described the song as "turn[ing] the tables on male rappers, taking charge of the sex game, matching their lewdest, rudest rhymes, and also featuring the most notorious backmasked vocal of the year." Bush cited the song as an example of Elliott's "artistic progression, trying to push hip-hop forward...neatly emphasizing her differences from other rappers by writing tracks for nearly every facet of the female side of relationships."

Rolling Stone ranked "Work It" 25th in its list "100 Best Songs of the 2000s" and number 56 on its list "Top 500 Greatest Songs of All Time. In 2003, The Village Voice named "Work It" the best single of 2002 on their annual year-end critics' poll Pazz & Jop; "Get Ur Freak On", a previous Elliott single, topped the same poll a year earlier.

Chart performance
"Work It" debuted on the US Billboard Hot 100 on chart issue dated September 14, 2002, at number 75. In its second and third weeks, it leaped up to number 42 and number 24, respectively, taking the Airplay Gainer title in both weeks. Within five weeks, it reached the top ten, at number 8, and gradually rose from there. On the chart issue dated November 16, 2002, the song reached number 2, but because of the massive success of "Lose Yourself" by Eminem, it never reached number one. Instead, the song stayed at number two for ten weeks, a record that it shares with "Waiting for a Girl Like You" by Foreigner from 1981. Despite never topping the Hot 100 chart, the song topped the Billboard Hot R&B/Hip-Hop Songs chart for five weeks.

On the Billboard magazine issue dated February 21, 2015, "Work It" re-entered at number 35, more than a decade after its original chart run. This re-entry occurred as a result of Elliott's performance at the Super Bowl XLIX halftime show earlier in the month; another Elliott single, "Get Ur Freak On," also re-entered the Billboard Hot 100 the same week.

Track listings

US 12-inch single
A1. "Work It" (album version)
A2. "Work It" (amended version)
A3. "Work It" (remix dirty featuring 50 Cent)
A4. "Work It" (remix clean featuring 50 Cent)
B1. "Pussycat" (album version)
B2. "Pussycat" (instrumental)
B3. "Work It" (instrumental)

UK CD single
 "Work It" (album version) – 4:25
 "Pussycat" (album version) – 3:36
 "4 My People" (Basement Jaxx remix video) – 2:58

UK 12-inch and cassette single
 "Work It" (album version) – 4:25
 "Work It" (instrumental) – 4:25
 "Pussycat" (album version) – 3:36

European CD single
 "Work It" (album version) – 4:25
 "Pussycat" (album version) – 3:36

Australian CD single
 "Work It" (album version)
 "Work It" (amended version)
 "Pussycat" (album version)

Charts

Weekly charts

Year-end charts

Decade-end charts

Certifications

Release history

References

Literature
Keazor, Henry; Thorsten Wuebbena: Video Thrills The Radio Star.

Michael Rappe, Under Construction. 2 Vols., Cologne 2011

2002 singles
Missy Elliott songs
MTV Video of the Year Award
Music videos directed by Dave Meyers (director)
Song recordings produced by Timbaland
Songs written by Missy Elliott
Songs written by Timbaland
2002 songs
Elektra Records singles
The Goldmind Inc. singles
Dirty rap songs